Ahmad Niyaltigin was a treasurer of Sultan Mahmud Ghaznavi and later of his son Sultan Mas'ud Ghaznavi. Sultan Masud appointed him governor of Punjab region in 1033. Ahmad Niyaltigin with small detachment of soldiers raided Varanasi, before withdrawing back to Punjab.

In 1034, Governor Ahmad Niyaltigin made daring attack at Varanasi but immediately withdrew back to Punjab region with plunder. Niyaltigin did not remit part of this plunder to Sultan Mas'ud Ghaznavi. Sultan considered it as rebellious act of Governor Niyaltigin. Sultan Mas'ud Ghaznavi commanded General Tilak Rai, one of his Hindu generals to arrest Governor Niyaltigin. Tilak Rai pursued Ahmad with a large body of men, chiefly Hindu Jats, Ahmad Niyaltigin was killed and his head was taken to Ghazni.

See also 
 Tijara
 Ahirs
 Pataudi
 Sultan Mahmud Ghaznavi
 Ghazi Saiyyad Salar Masud
 Bakhtiyar Khalji
 Moinuddin Chishti
 Ashraf Jahangir Semnani

External links 
 The Marriage of Lat Bhairava and Ghazi Miyan
 Mirati Mas’udi by ‘Abdur Rahman Chishti
 Ghaznavid Dynasty, 962–1186 CE

References 

Ghaznavid Empire
Medieval India